Per Frykman (born 1964) is a paralympic equestrian from Sweden.

He was a member of the riding club in Kristianstad and competed in the 1984 Summer Paralympics, where he won a gold and a bronze medal in dressage.

References

External links 
 

1964 births
Living people
Swedish male equestrians
Paralympic equestrians of Sweden
Paralympic gold medalists for Sweden
Paralympic bronze medalists for Sweden
Paralympic medalists in equestrian
Equestrians at the 1984 Summer Paralympics
Medalists at the 1984 Summer Paralympics
People from Kristianstad Municipality
Sportspeople from Skåne County
20th-century Swedish people